Glenmore Park High School (abbreviated as GPHS) is a public school in the suburb of Glenmore Park in the local government area of Penrith, New South Wales.

The school caters to all types and levels of high school education. The school has fully equipped scientific laboratories, wood, metal and hospitality workshops. The current principal is Lisette Gorick.

According to the GPHS School Plan, the school "has extremely strong connections with [the] wider community" through which it provides "holistic, innovative, supported educational opportunities" for all students.

References

External links 
School Website

1998 establishments in Australia
Educational institutions established in 1998
Public high schools in Sydney